Magdalena Fransson  (born 1971) is a Swedish politician. She is a member of the Centre Party and was chairman of Centre Party Youth from 1996 to 1999.

References
This article was initially translated from the Swedish Wikipedia article.

Centre Party (Sweden) politicians
1972 births
Living people